Østlendingen is a daily, regional newspaper published in Elverum, Norway. With a circulation of 19,000, it covers the regions of Østerdalen, Solør, Glåmdalen, Trysil and Engerdal. The newspaper is controlled by Edda Media.

References

External links
Official site

Daily newspapers published in Norway
Companies based in Hedmark
Mass media in Elverum